Jung Mi-ran (born 20 March 1985) is a Korean former basketball player who competed in the 2004 Summer Olympics.

References

1985 births
Living people
South Korean women's basketball players
Olympic basketball players of South Korea
Basketball players at the 2004 Summer Olympics